The Weltmeister E5 is a battery electric compact sedan that is manufactured by the Chinese NEV manufacturer WM Motor (Chinese: 威马汽车) under the brand Weltmeister. The E5 is the first product of the economy E series products of Weltmeister, which is a series of products built for entry level budget buyers and ride hailing services.

Overview

The design of the Weltmeister E5 is based on a simplified platform with MacPherson struts at the front and twist-beam rear suspension, with standard wheels being 17 inches. The interior equipment is focused on taxis and rental services, with no multimedia system in the cabin. In the place where the screen is connected, a USB connector for connecting gadgets is the only feature with no buttons on the steering wheel. The air conditioning is a single-zone climate control with hardware buttons and knobs. In a more upmarket configuration, a 12.3-inch multimedia system screen, leatherette seat upholstery and a panoramic roof is offered.

References

Compact cars
Sedans
Production electric cars
Cars introduced in 2021
Cars of China